Myrosmodes inaequalis (synonym: Aa inaequalis) is a species of orchid in the genus Myrosmodes.

It is native to Peru and Bolivia.

References

Cranichidinae
Plants described in 1912